Kalimeris pinnatifida, also known as the double Japanese aster is a species of flowering plant in the family Asteraceae.

References

M. Tara, (1997).Herbarium Analysis on Kalimeris pinnatifida in Japan, Bulletin of School of Education, Okayama University.

Astereae